Mark Lemmon (1889–1975) was an American architect.

Mark Lemmon may also refer to:

 Mark A. Lemmon, a professor of Pharmacology at Yale University

See also
 Mark Lemon (1809–1870), British editor
 Mark Lemon (speedway rider)